Eburneana is a genus of the spider family Salticidae (jumping spiders).

Like several other salticids, this genus mimicks ants.

Description
Eburneana are rather big ant-like spiders with a constricted cephalothorax. The body is very flat and rather slender. The cephalic and thoracic parts are parted by a clear constriction to mimic the ant body plan. Unlike other African ant-like salticids Eburneana has the chelicerae located more posteriorly, rich leg spination and clearly visible large spigots on the posterior spinnerets.

Relationships
The structure of genitalia and the shape of the first legs resembles males of the subfamily Pelleninae, but the phylogenetic relationships of Eburneana to other genera are unclear.

Name
The genus is named after the Latin name of Ivory Coast, Litus Eburneum, where one of the species was first found.

Species
 Eburneana magna Wesołowska & Szűts, 2001 – Ivory Coast
 Eburneana scharffi Wesołowska & Szűts, 2001 – Tanzania
 Eburneana wandae Szűts, 2003 – Cameroon

References
  (2001): A new genus of ant-like jumping spiders from Africa (Araneae: Salticidae). Annales Zoologici (Warsawa) 51(4): 523-528.
  (2003): A new species of Eburneana Wesołowska & Szűts with notes on the biogeography and morphology of the genus (Araneae: Salticidae). Genus 14(3): 419-424. PDF
  (2009): The world spider catalog, version 9.5. American Museum of Natural History.

Salticidae
Spiders of Africa
Salticidae genera
Taxa named by Wanda Wesołowska